Luis Fernández Gutiérrez (born 29 September 1972) is a Spanish retired footballer who played as a left-back.

In a professional career which spanned almost 20 years, he was best known for his spell at Betis (also represented Racing de Santander), in which he played one full decade.

Club career
Fernández was born in Argomilla, Cantabria. After making his professional starts with lowly Gimnástica de Torrelavega, he made his La Liga debut for local giants Racing de Santander against Atlético Madrid, on 24 April 1994. He went on to play 56 competitive games, before being transferred to Real Betis of the same league for the 1996–97 season.

At Betis, Fernández consistently appeared as his team's main left-back for ten years. He featured in the UEFA Champions League for the Seville club in 2005–06, after contributing 22 league appearances the previous campaign.

Aged 34, Fernández returned to Racing for 2006–07, playing 19 matches in his second season as the Cantabrians achieved a first-ever qualification for the UEFA Cup. On 19 April 2009, as he was nothing more than a fringe player, he appeared in his 300th top-division game, a 1–0 loss at RCD Espanyol, and retired in the summer at the age of nearly 37, continuing to work with the club as a scout in the following years.

Honours
Betis
Copa del Rey: 2004–05

References

External links

Betisweb stats and bio 

1972 births
Living people
Spanish footballers
Footballers from Cantabria
Association football defenders
La Liga players
Segunda División players
Segunda División B players
Gimnástica de Torrelavega footballers
Racing de Santander players
Real Betis players